Liudian Township may refer to:

Liudian Township, Kaifeng County, in Henan, China
Liudian Township, Yucheng County, in Yucheng County, Henan, China